Hudo is a settlement north of Radomlje in the Municipality of Domžale in the Upper Carniola region of Slovenia.

References

External links 

Hudo on Geopedia

Populated places in the Municipality of Domžale